Panjin is a coastal prefecture-level city in central Liaoning province, People's Republic of China, situated on the northern shore of the Liaodong Bay. It borders Anshan to the east, Yingkou to the southeast, and Jinzhou to the west and north.

Administration
Panjin has administrative jurisdiction over 3 districts and 1 county.

Panjin was established as a prefecture-level city with its current boundaries by the State Council on June 5, 1984.

Geography 
Panjin is located between 40°40'−41°27' N and 121°31'−122°28' E, with its urban section mainly on the historical Liao River Delta.  The Shuangtaizi River (which gives name to the city's Shuangtaizi District), formally the smaller western distributary but now the only lower section of the Liao River system, flows through the city and drains into the Liaodong Bay to its west between its Dawa District and Panshan County.  The Daliao River, historically Liao River's larger eastern distributary and the main lower section but now a separate river system since 1958, runs east of Panjin, serving as the border between it and the neighboring cities of Anshan and Yingkou.

Panjin is a major crude oil production centre of Northeast China, with access to the Liaohe Oil Field, which was once the third largest oil field in China behind Daqing and Shengli Oil Fields.

Climate 
Panjin has a monsoon-influenced humid continental climate (Köppen Dwa).

Attractions
Major points of interest include:

 Shuangtaihekou State Natural Reserve, a marshland that serves as natural habitat to 321 species of animals.  It also serves as one of the few breeding grounds for endangered birds such as the red-crowned crane and Saunders' gull.  Millions of birds of as much as 172 different species stop at the area during their migration, including more than 20 endangered species such as the red-crowned crane, demoiselle crane, white stork, black stork, white-fronted goose, whooper swan, and brown goshawk.  On a special note, Panjin is also called "Home of the Cranes" for the above reasons.
 reed-grass beach (Golden Beach at Bohai Sea) and the clam mound
 Red Seabeach
 Hubin Park in Panshan, featuring the Liaohe Tablets.  These stone tablets bear inscriptions of Chinese calligraphy by historical and contemporary artists.

See also
List of twin towns and sister cities in China
Zhou Yongkang, one-time mayor of Panjin

Education 

 Higher Education:

Dalian University of Technology, Panjin Campus

Liaohe Petroleum Career Technical College

Panjin Vocational and Technical College

 Secondary Education:

Panjin Senior Middle School

LYYG

References

External links
 Panjin's official website in Simplified Chinese

 
Cities in Liaoning
Prefecture-level divisions of Liaoning